William Christoph of Hesse-Homburg (13 November 1625, Ober-Rosbach – 27 August 1681, then in Bingenheim, now in Echzell) was the second Landgraf of Hesse-Homburg (then known as "Landgraf of Bingenheim") during 1648–1669.

He was the third (second surviving) of five sons of Frederick I, Landgrave of Hesse-Homburg, and succeeded his brother Ludwig I as Landgrave in 1643, but his mother was regent until 1648.

Life
In 1669, he sold Homburg to his younger brother George Christian, but retained Bingenheim (Landgrave of Hesse-Homburg-Bingenheim). George Christian died without heirs, and their youngest brother succeeded as Frederick II, Landgrave of Hesse-Homburg.

In Darmstadt on 21 April 1650 William Christoph married firstly Princess Sophia Eleonore, daughter of George II, Landgrave of Hesse-Darmstadt. George II was his first cousin, as both were grandsons of George I, Landgrave of Hesse-Darmstadt. They had 12 children, but only three survived infancy:
Frederick, Hereditary Landgrave of Hesse-Homburg (Darmstadt, 12 March 1651 - Homburg v.d.Höhe, 27 July 1651).
Christine Wilhelmine (Bingenheim, 30 June 1653 – Grabow, 16 May 1722), married Frederick, Duke of Mecklenburg-Grabow.
Leopold George, Hereditary Landgrave of Hesse-Homburg (Bingenheim, 25 October 1654 – Schloss Gravenstein, Schleswig-Holstein, 26 February 1675), died unmarried.
Frederick (Bingenheim, 5 September 1655 - Bingenheim, 6 September 1655).
William (Bingenheim, 13 August 1656 - Bingenheim, 4 September 1656).
Stillborn son (23 June 1657).
Charles William (Bingenheim, 6 May 1658 - Bingenheim, 13 December 1658).
Philipp (Bingenheim, 20 June 1659 - Bingenheim, 6 October 1659).
Magdalene Sophie (Bingenheim, 24 April 1660 – Braunfels, 22 March 1720), married William Maurice, Count of Solms-Braunfels; among their children: Christine Charlotte of Solms-Braunfels and Frederick William, Prince of Solms-Braunfels.
Stillborn son (7 June 1661).
Frederick William (Bingenheim, 29 November 1662 - Homburg, 5 March 1663).
Stillborn son (7 October 1663).

In Lübeck on 2 April 1665 William Christoph married secondly Princess Anna Elisabeth of Saxe-Lauenburg, a daughter of Duke Augustus of Saxe-Lauenburg. In 1672 they were divorced and Anna Elisabeth retired to and later died in Philippseck Castle in today's Butzbach.

References

1625 births
1681 deaths
Landgraves of Hesse
House of Hesse-Homburg